Pulad-e Qasemi (also Romanized as Pūlād-e Qāsemī; also known as Fūlād Qāsemī) is a village in Band-e Zarak Rural District, in the Central District of Minab County, Hormozgan Province, Iran. At the 2006 census, its population was 1,392, in 261 families.

References 

Populated places in Minab County